is a type of rice wine and a common ingredient in Japanese cooking. It is similar to sake but with a lower alcohol content and higher sugar content. The sugar content is a complex carbohydrate that forms naturally during the fermentation process; no sugars are added. The alcohol content is further lowered when the liquid is heated.

Three types of mirin are common. The first is hon mirin (literally: true mirin), which contains about 14% alcohol and is produced by a 40 to 60 day mashing (saccharification) process. The second is shio mirin (literally: salt mirin), which contains a minimum of 1.5% salt to prevent consumption in order to avoid alcohol tax. The third is shin mirin (literally: new mirin), or mirin-fu chomiryo (literally: mirin-like seasoning), which contains less than 1% alcohol, yet retains the same flavor.

In the Edo period, mirin was consumed as amazake. O-toso, traditionally consumed for the Japanese New Year, can be made by soaking a spice mixture in mirin.

In the Kansai style of cooking, mirin is briefly boiled before use, allowing some alcohol to evaporate. In the Kantō regional style, the mirin is used untreated. Kansai-style boiled mirin is called nikiri mirin (literally: thoroughly boiled mirin).

Mirin adds a bright touch to grilled or broiled fish or erases the fishy smell. A small amount is often used instead of sugar and soy sauce. Its flavor is quite strong. It is sometimes used to accompany sushi.

November 30 has been designated the day of hon-mirin by the mirin industry because in Japanese wordplay, the date words sound like '11' (good) and '30' (mirin).

Uses
Mirin is also an ingredient in other sauces:
 Kabayaki  (grilled eel) sauce: mirin, soy sauce, sake, sugar, fish bone (optional)
 Nikiri mirin sauce: soy sauce, dashi, mirin, sake, in a ratio of 10:2:1:1 
 Sushi su (sushi rice vinaigrette): rice wine vinegar, sugar, nikiri mirin sauce
Teriyaki sauce

See also
 Japanese flavorings
 Mijiu – Chinese rice wine that can be used in cooking
 Huangjiu – Chinese rice wine that can be used in cooking

References

Japanese condiments
Probiotic foods
Rice wine